Cees Rentmeester (born 27 January 1947) is a Dutch racing cyclist. He rode in the 1970 Tour de France.

References

1947 births
Living people
Dutch male cyclists
Place of birth missing (living people)